This is a list of Pakistani films released in 2018. Jawani Phir Nahi Ani 2 is the all time grossing pakistani film released on EidulAzha this year.

Highest grossing films
 
The top 10 films released in 2018 by worldwide gross are as follows:

Background color  indicates the current releases

Events

Award ceremonies

Film festivals

Releases

January – April

May – August

September – December

References

2018
Lists of 2018 films by country or language
Films